Collection is a greatest hits album by American alternative rock band Caroline's Spine. It also includes a few live recordings.

Track listing
 "Drift Away"  – 3:19
 "End Up"  – 3:44
 "Sullivan"  – 4:05
 "Wallflower"  – 5:03
 "Monsoon"  – 4:33
 "King For a Day"  – 3:27
 "Necro"  – 3:08
 "Trio'Pain"  – 2:51
 "Psycho"  – 3:19
 "Jumpship" (live)  – 4:48
 "Attention Please" (live)  – 5:20
 "Nothing to Prove" (live)  – 4:30
 "Again and Again" (live)  – 4:23
 "Hippie Boy"  – 4:29
 "Overlooked"  – 3:45
 "July"  – 2:35
 "Ouch"  – 4:54
 "Unglued"  – 7:16
 "As I am"  – 2:07
 "Surprise"  – 2:51

Band Lineup
Jimmy Newquist - vocals, guitar
Mark Haugh - guitar, backing vocals
Scott Jones - bass, backing vocals
Jason Gilardi - drums

2006 greatest hits albums
Caroline's Spine albums